Santiago Úbeda (born 4 July 1996) is an Argentine professional footballer who plays as a midfielder for Deportivo Morón on loan from Sol de America.

Career
Don Villa and Sport Club Quiroga were Úbeda's first teams, he featured for both in youth football before making his senior bow for the latter at the age of fifteen. He left to join Independiente Rivadavia in 2013, initially playing for their academy prior to stepping up to senior level during the 2017–18 Primera B Nacional; initially appearing on the substitutes bench for fixtures with Deportivo Morón, Atlético de Rafaela and Boca Unidos. He would eventually make eight appearances that season, which included his professional debut on 11 March 2018 against Quilmes.

Career statistics
.

References

External links

1996 births
Living people
Sportspeople from Mendoza, Argentina
Argentine footballers
Argentine expatriate footballers
Association football midfielders
Primera Nacional players
Independiente Rivadavia footballers
Club Sol de América footballers
Deportivo Morón footballers
Argentine expatriate sportspeople in Paraguay
Expatriate footballers in Paraguay